Alvy is a masculine given name or nickname. It may refer to:
 Alvy Ashraf.H (born 2009) Bangladeshi person
 Alvy Moore (1921–1997), American actor
 Alvy Powell (born 1955), American opera singer and US Army soldier
 Alvy Ray Smith (born 1943), American computer scientist who worked on computer animation in films
 Alvy Singer, Woody Allen's character in the film Annie Hall

English-language masculine given names